James Paul Clarke (August 18, 1854 – October 1, 1916) was a United States Senator and the 18th Governor of Arkansas as well as a white supremacist.

Biography
Clarke was born in Yazoo City, Mississippi. His father died when Clarke was seven years old, and he was raised by his mother. Clarke attended public schools as well as Tutwilder's Academy in Greenbrier, Alabama. He graduated with a law degree at the University of Virginia in 1878. Clarke was admitted to the bar in 1879, and practiced law at Helena, Arkansas.

Career

Clarke served as a member of the Arkansas House of Representatives from 1886 to 1888. He became a member of the Arkansas Senate from 1888 to 1892 and served as president of the Senate in 1891. He was elected Attorney General of Arkansas and served from 1892 to 1894. He served as Governor of Arkansas from 1895 to 1897. Clarke was devoted to "upholding white supremacy as the keystone of the Democratic Party. 'The people of the South,' he said in his closing speech of the election, 'looked to the Democratic party to preserve the white standards of civilization.' Clarke easily defeated his opponents."

His term was largely unsuccessful and his legislation to end prizefighting and establish four-year terms for state officers failed. After leaving office in 1897, he moved his permanent residence to Little Rock, Arkansas and practiced law. Clarke was elected to the United States Senate in 1903 and served until his death in 1916. He served as President pro tempore of the United States Senate during the Sixty-third and Sixty-fourth Congresses.

Death and legacy
Clarke died in Little Rock, Arkansas. He is buried at Oakland Cemetery in Little Rock.

Clarke's statue is one of two statues that was presented by the State of Arkansas to the National Statuary Hall Collection at the United States Capitol. In 2019 the decision was made to replace his statue, and that of Uriah Milton Rose, with statues of Johnny Cash and Daisy Lee Gatson Bates. In the case of Clarke, the reason given is "his racist beliefs". Clarke's own great-great-grandson, State Senator Clarke Tucker, in a 2018 column strongly supported replacing Clarke's statue: "I strongly hope one of the new statues will be Daisy Bates or a member of the Little Rock Nine."

See also
List of United States Congress members who died in office (1900–49)

References

External links
 
 Encyclopedia of Arkansas History & Culture entry: James Paul Clarke

 
 Old State House Museum
 James P. Clarke, late a senator from Arkansas, Memorial addresses delivered in the House of Representatives and Senate frontispiece 1917

Arkansas lawyers
Democratic Party governors of Arkansas
Democratic Party Arkansas state senators
Democratic Party members of the Arkansas House of Representatives
1854 births
1916 deaths
People from Yazoo City, Mississippi
University of Virginia School of Law alumni
Arkansas Attorneys General
Democratic Party United States senators from Arkansas
19th-century American politicians
Presidents pro tempore of the United States Senate
American white supremacists
19th-century American lawyers